Russia  competed at the inaugural World Beach Games in Doha, Qatar from 12 to 16 October 2019. A total of 55 sportsmen competed in 9 sports.

Medalists

|width="30%" align=left valign=top|

Competitors

References

Nations at the 2019 World Beach Games
World Beach Games